Hakea undulata, commonly known as wavy-leaved hakea,  is a flowering plant in the family Proteaceae and is endemic to the south-west of Western Australia. It has stiff wavy leaves and fragrant cream-white flowers from mid-winter to October.

Description
The smaller branches are smooth by flowering. The green-grey leaves have distinctive  venation above and below and taper on long stalks to the leaf base. The single inflorescence consist of 12-21 sweetly scented cream-white flowers in a raceme on  smooth pedicel. Flowering occurs from July to October.

Taxonomy and naming
Hakea undulata was first formally described by botanist Robert Brown in Transactions of the Linnean Society of London in 1810. Named from the Latin undulatus - wavy, referring to the leaf margins.

Distribution and habitat
Wavy-leaved hakea grows from the Darling Ranges north of Perth and south to Albany. This species grows in scrubland and woodland in sand, loam and gravel or with a clay soil over laterite, sometimes on granite. It requires a sunny position with good drainage. A good species for hedging and wildlife habitat.

Conservation status
Hakea undulata is classified as "not threatened" by the Western Australian Government.

References

undulata
Eudicots of Western Australia
Taxa named by Robert Brown (botanist, born 1773)